Fez VI: Wizard's Dilemma is an adventure for fantasy role-playing games published by Mayfair Games in 1989.

Contents
Fez VI: Wizard's Dilemma is a scenario for character levels 4–6, the final entry in the Fez series.  Fez the wizard is caught in a time paradox that may result in his ceasing to exist, and the adventurers must help him out of his predicament.

Publication history
Fez VI: Wizard's Dilemma was written by Robert Moore and James Robert, with a cover by David Cherry and illustrations by Gerald O'Malley, and was published by Mayfair Games in 1989 as a 32-page book.

Reception
Lawrence Schick in his book Heroic Worlds notes that the adventure "Includes a map of Chaos that the authors wish was funny."

References

Fantasy role-playing game adventures
Role Aids
Role-playing game supplements introduced in 1989